The Search, Analytics and Social Media Conference (SASCon) is an annual UK marketing conference series focused on search engine marketing, social media marketing and search engine optimisation. The conference takes place in Manchester over 2 days and includes seminars, workshops and discussion panels. Venues have included Bridgewater Hall (2010), The Hive (2011–2012) and Manchester Metropolitan University Business School (2013–2014).

History
The conference was created by Richard Gregory, Simon Wharton, Pete Young, Peter Cobley, Ben McKay and Richard Hudson in 2009. Past keynote speakers include Mike Little, co-founder of WordPress.

See also
 Search engine optimization
 Social media optimization
 Search engine marketing
 Search Engine Strategies

References

External links
 
Analytics and Social Media

Search engine optimization
Recurring events established in 2009
Internet marketing trade shows